Zavrtače is a settlement in the hills to the southeast of Višnja Gora in the Municipality of Ivančna Gorica in the historical region of Lower Carniola in central Slovenia. The municipality is included in the Central Slovenia Statistical Region.

Church

The local church, built on an isolated hill south of the settlement, is dedicated to the Holy Spirit and belongs to the Parish of Krka. It dates to the 16th century.

References

External links

Zavrtače on Geopedia

Populated places in the Municipality of Ivančna Gorica